The Li Auto L9 (literal translation: dream or ideal L9) is a luxury full-size crossover SUV by Li Xiang, and it is also the second vehicle from the Chinese automobile manufacturer.

As of 2022 it has the longest electric range of any PHEV in the world (215 km in the NEDC cycle), just above the BMW i3 120 Ah REx (203 km in the EPA cycle).

History 

The L9 was unveiled online in March 2022 and officially launched in June 2022 with the first vehicles to be delivered in China from August 2022.

Specifications 

The vehicle can be described as a range extended vehicle or as a PHEV. It has two electric motors: a  motor in the front and a  motor in the rear. It is also equipped with a front-mounted 1.5-litre turbocharged 4-cylinder petrol engine with a  petrol tank capacity. The petrol engine is a range extender for the electric motors; it does not directly power the wheels.

The L9 accelerates  in 5.3 seconds.

Charging to 80% takes 40 minutes with a fast charger. A full charge at 200V takes 6 hours.

It is an SUV, available with six or seven seats in three rows.

Price

As of June 2022, the Li One price is 459,800 RMB ($68,418)

References

Cars of China
All-wheel-drive vehicles
Cars introduced in 2022
Full-size sport utility vehicles
Hybrid electric cars
Plug-in hybrid vehicles